Molybdenum cofactor cytidylyltransferase (MocA, CTP:molybdopterin cytidylyltransferase, MoCo cytidylyltransferase, Mo-MPT cytidyltransferase) is an enzyme with systematic name CTP:molybdenum cofactor cytidylyltransferase. This enzyme catalyses the following chemical reaction:

 CTP + molybdenum cofactor  diphosphate + cytidylyl molybdenum cofactor

Catalyses the cytidylation of the molybdenum cofactor.

References

External links 

EC 2.7.7